Dzung Tran is a retired Vietnamese-American soccer player who spent time in the Major Indoor Soccer League, Western Soccer Alliance and National Professional Soccer League.

In 1978, Tran, his father and brother, escaped Vietnam after the communist capture of South Vietnam.  He attended Livermore High School before transferring to San Jose High School where he graduated in 1983.  In 1984, he practiced with the Golden Bay Earthquakes, including playing two minutes of a preseason game.  That fall, he began playing soccer at Foothill College, but Golden Gate Conference officials determined that his game with the Earthquakes counted as a professional event.  Therefore, he was stripped of his collegiate eligibility during the season.  In June 1985, the San Diego Sockers selected Tran in the first round of the Major Indoor Soccer League draft.  The Sockers released him in December 1985.  In 1985, he played for the San Jose Earthquakes which won the Western Alliance Challenge Series.  He continued to play for the Earthquakes in 1986 before moving to the Los Angeles Heat for the 1987 Western Soccer Alliance season.  In the fall of 1986, Tran signed with the Milwaukee Wave of the American Indoor Soccer Association. In 1988, he returned to the Earthquakes.  In 1990, he played for the Salt Lake Sting in the American Professional Soccer League.  He then returned to the Milwaukee Wave for the 1990–1991 indoor season.  In 1991, he began the season with the Sting which folded halfway through the season.  He then signed with the San Francisco Bay Blackhawks.  He later played for the San Jose Oaks.

References

External links
MISL stats

People from Huế
Vietnamese emigrants to the United States
American sportspeople of Vietnamese descent
American soccer players
American Indoor Soccer Association players
American Professional Soccer League players
Foothill Owls men's soccer players
Los Angeles Heat players
Major Indoor Soccer League (1978–1992) players
Milwaukee Wave players
National Professional Soccer League (1984–2001) players
Salt Lake Sting players
San Diego Sockers (original MISL) players
San Francisco Bay Blackhawks players
San Jose Earthquakes (1974–1988) players
San Jose Oaks players
Western Soccer Alliance players
Living people
Soccer players from San Jose, California
Association football forwards
Year of birth missing (living people)
Association football midfielders